Comités Abertos de Faculdade (CAF, Open Faculty Committees in English) was a student organization of Galiza. Formed from the union of different faculty assemblies. The main goals of the CAF were defending quality and the Galician language public education. It was an assembly-based organization. The CAF were considered the heirs of the ERGA.

Composition
The CAF traditionally incorporated almost all of the nationalist left organizations operating at the university (Galician Nationalist Bloc, Galician Socialist Party-Galician Left, MCG, Communist Party of the Galician People...), but with the integration of most of these groups in the Galician Nationalist Bloc the organization ended being formed mainly by militants of Galiza Nova and people without party affiliation.

History
During the effervescence of the student struggles at the University of Santiago de Compostela, in the early eighties of the twentieth century, a number of Assemblies of Center emerged and united around the year of 1986 in the Comités Abertos (Open Committees, although some, such as the CAMAE, will remain semi-autonomous ). Although theoretically the CA covered the whole university, in practice it was an organization with a very strong presence in Santiago de Compostela and marginal in the other campus. It was only from the segregation of the universities of A Coruña and Vigo when the organization began to have presence in all the (seven) campus. The origins worked at the Faculty Assembly and a coordinating body (Campus Council) made up of two people from each school.

Since its establishment, with the dissolution of ERGA, in 1988, the CAF grew and became the most important student union in Galiza, present in almost all of the academic institutions with student representation.

In the 90's the CAF suffered the split of the Movemento Estudantil Universitario (MEU), in reaction to what they denounced as the Galician People's Union control of the organization. The CAF managed to recover its presence slightly, specially after the disappearance of the MEU.

In 2008 the internal crises of CAE and the CAF lead to their unification in a new project, the Comités.

References

 Beramendi, X.G. (2007): De provincia a nación. Historia do galeguismo político. Xerais, Vigo

Secessionist organizations in Europe
1988 establishments in Spain
Galician nationalism
Socialism